Kab? Kyoon? Aur Kahan? is a 1970 Bollywood mystery film directed by Arjun Hingorani. The film stars Dharmendra, Babita and Pran.   It is inspired by the French classic film Les Diaboliques (film) (1955), including the bathtub scene.

Cast

Dharmendra ... C.I.D.  Inspector Anand
Babita Kapoor ... Asha Prasad
Pran ... Daljit Prasad
Helen ... Rita
Ashoo ... Lata
Murad ... Rai Bahadur Jagdish Prasad
Asit Sen ...   Constable Hanuman Prasad
Jankidas ... Masoom Ali
Hari Shivdasani ... Police Superintendent Gupta
Dhumal ...  Stewart
Mohan Choti ... Taxi Driver
Arjun Hingorani ... Bihari

Soundtrack
Lyrics written by Anjaan and Indeevar.

References

External links
 

1970 films
1970s Hindi-language films
1970s mystery films
Films scored by Kalyanji Anandji